Harrold may refer to:

Places
Harrold, Bedfordshire in the United Kingdom
Harrold, South Dakota in the United States
Harrold, Texas in the United States
Harrold Independent School District serving Harrold, Texas, United States

People
Harrold (surname), surname in the English language